

Roster

Regular season
During the 1980 NCAA Division I men's basketball tournament, Purdue qualified for the Final Four, where they lost to UCLA.

NCAA basketball tournament
Midwest
Purdue (#6 seed) 90, LaSalle 82
Purdue 87, St. John’s, New York 72
Purdue 76, Indiana 69
Purdue 68, Duke 60
Final Four
UCLA 67, Purdue 62
Purdue 75, Iowa 58 (3rd Place / Consolation Game)

Awards and honors

Team players drafted into the NBA

References

Purdue Boilermarkers
Purdue
Purdue Boilermakers men's basketball seasons
NCAA Division I men's basketball tournament Final Four seasons
Purdue Boilermakers men's basketball
Purdue Boilermakers men's basketball